Louisiana Museum may refer to:
Louisiana Museum of Modern Art in Denmark
Louisiana State Museum in the United States